Kokomian (also spelled Kokomia) is a town in the far east of Ivory Coast. It is a sub-prefecture of Koun-Fao Department in Gontougo Region, Zanzan District. Four kilometres southeast of town is a border crossing with Ghana.

Kokomian was a commune until March 2012, when it became one of 1126 communes nationwide that were abolished.

In 2014, the population of the sub-prefecture of Kokomian was 10,438.

Villages
The eight villages of the sub-prefecture of Kokomian and their population in 2014 are:
 Bossignamienkro (1 057)
 Ifo (858)
 Koffi-Badoukro (2 891)
 Kokomian (2 195)
 Petit-Abengourou (964)
 Sogoyaokro (869)
 Takikro (1 438)
 Warèkro (166)

Notes

Sub-prefectures of Gontougo
Former communes of Ivory Coast